Yogaville is a census-designated place in northwestern Buckingham County, Virginia. The population as of the 2010 Census was 226. The interfaith yoga community Satchidananda Ashram - Yogaville is the major physical feature and population center of the CDP.

References

Census-designated places in Buckingham County, Virginia
Census-designated places in Virginia